The Episcopal Palace (German: Erzbischöfliches Palais) in Vienna, Austria is the seat of the Archbishop of Vienna. It is located in the centre of the city next to St. Stephen's Cathedral.

History 
The structure dates back to the middle ages. The current appearance came about in the baroque period of the 17th and 18th century.

See also 
 Episcopal Summer Palace, Bratislava

References

External links 
 

Episcopal palaces of the Catholic Church
Palaces in Vienna